Seven Day Jesus is the debut album by the band of the same name. It was released in 1998 by ForeFront Records.

Track listing
All songs written by Brian McSweeney, except where noted.
 "Down with the Ship" – 3:01
 "Always Comes Around" – 3:59
 "Butterfly" (McSweeney, Douglas Kaine McKelvey) – 2:52
 "Everybody Needs Love" – 4:45
 "Who I Am" – 3:27
 "End of My Rope" – 3:52
 "Sea of Forgetfulness" (McSweeney, McKelvey) – 5:45
 "I Will Find You" – 3:41
 "My Friend" – 4:14
 "You Are the One" – 4:19

Personnel
 Brian McSweeney
 Kevin Adkins
 Chris Beaty
 Russ Fox
 Matt Sumter

References

1998 debut albums
Seven Day Jesus albums